General elections were held in Greenland on 4 April 1979, the first election to the new Parliament after the introduction of home rule. The result was a victory for the separatist and left wing Siumut, which won 13 of the 21 seats in the Parliament, over the unionist and moderate Atassut. The difference in seats won became relatively large because of the use of first past the post in five constituencies in northern and eastern Greenland, which were all won by Siumut, while the two parties split the 16 seats in the multi member constituencies in Western Greenland evenly. As a result of the election Jonathan Motzfeldt from Siumut became the first head of government in Greenland.

Results

References

Elections in Greenland
Greenland
1979 in Greenland